American City Flags is a special double volume issue of Raven: A Journal of Vexillology, a peer-reviewed journal published by the North American Vexillological Association. It is the first comprehensive work on the subject, documenting the municipal flags of the largest 100 U.S. cities, all 50 state capitals, and at least two cities in each state. Each article describes in detail the flag's design, adoption date, proportions, symbolism, selection, designer, and predecessors.

See also 
 Vexillology

Publication details 
 

American non-fiction books
Flag literature